The Crime of Doctor Hallet is a 1938 American drama film, directed by S. Sylvan Simon and starring Ralph Bellamy, Josephine Hutchinson, William Gargan, Barbara Read, John 'Dusty' King, and Charles Stevens. The film was released by Universal Pictures on March 11, 1938.

Plot
Doctor Hallet is working in the jungle with his wife to find the cure to the red fever, when another doctor comes to be a guinea pig for them, since he doesn't believe in Doctor Hallet's work, the men ends up dying and Doctor Hallet takes his identity and tries to finish the dead man's job.

Cast
Ralph Bellamy as Dr. Paul Hallet
Josephine Hutchinson as Dr. Mary Reynolds
William Gargan as Dr. Jack Murray
Barbara Read as Claire Saunders
John 'Dusty' King as Dr. Philip Saunders (as John King)
Charles Stevens as Talamu
Honorable Wu as Molugi
Nella Walker as Mrs. Carpenter
Eleanor Hansen as Anna
Constance Moore as Susan
Brandon Beach as Party Guest (uncredited)
John Dawson as Photographer (uncredited)
Jack Egan as Party Guest (uncredited)
Allen Fox as Pilot (uncredited)
Ben Lewis as Reporter (uncredited)
William Lundigan as Party Guest (uncredited)
Frances Robinson as Party Guest (uncredited)
Larry Steers as Party Guest (uncredited)
Marilyn Stuart as Party Guest (uncredited)
Bud Wolfe as Party Guest (uncredited)

References

External links
The Crime of Dr. Hallet at the Internet Movie Database

1938 films
American drama films
1938 drama films
Films directed by S. Sylvan Simon
Universal Pictures films
American black-and-white films
1930s English-language films
1930s American films